Francis Phillip A. Allera is a Filipino former professional basketball player. He last played for the Powerade Tigers in the Philippine Basketball Association. He played the small forward position.

References

External links
Allera / PBA.ph profile

1985 births
Living people
Filipino men's basketball players
Small forwards
UST Growling Tigers basketball players
Basketball players from Davao City
Powerade Tigers players
Barako Bull Energy draft picks